The Madrid tramway network is a network of tramways forming part of the public transport system in Madrid, the capital of Spain.
Parts of the network include(d):
The historical street-running tramway network in central Madrid, functioning between 1871 and 1972.
The Metro Ligero de Madrid, a tramway network of three lines, which began operations in 2007. 
The Parla Tram, a circular line in suburb south of Madrid, inaugurated in 2007. 

Tram transport in Spain
Madrid
Rail transport in Madrid